Malden High School is a public high school located in Malden, Missouri. The school serves about 465 students in grades 7 to 12. It is part of the Malden R-1 School District.

Sports championships
3A School Sports (2A Football)
Last State Championship 2007 Track
Recent Championships 2011 Class 2 District 1 Baseball

References

External links
Malden R-1 School District website
U.S. News: Best High Schools - Malden High School

Schools in Dunklin County, Missouri
Educational institutions established in 1987
Public high schools in Missouri
1987 establishments in Missouri